Bertoia is the name of

 Don Bertoia (born 1940), Canadian middle-distance runner
 Harry Bertoia (1915–1978), Italian-born American artist, sound art sculptor, and modern furniture designer
 Jacopo Bertoia (1544 – ca. 1574), Italian painter
 Reno Bertoia (1935–2011), Italian-born professional baseball player